The Battle of the Crna bend was a two-month-long battle between the Bulgarian and the Entente armies. The battle took place in the Macedonian front during the First World War Allied Monastir Offensive in October and November 1916. After extremely heavy fighting and severe casualties on both sides, the Bulgarians retreated from Bitola on the 19 November and took positions at 5 km to the north by defeating all later attacks from there. However, the Entente entry in Bitola had no strategic value.

Battle

In August 1916 the Bulgarians launched the Lerin operation. The Entente troops started a counter-attack and on 30 September took Kajmakčalan with heavy casualties and continued to Bitola. In the area of the River Crna (Macedonian and) the Bulgarian 8th Tundzha Infantry Division had taken hastily defensive positions in September 1916. That division took the main enemy blow. On 5 October the Serbian troops made their first attempt to cross the river. Some of them reach the right bank but were counter-attacked by the Bulgarians and defeated and had to retreat. 

On 6 October, the Serbs attack again near the villages of Dobroveni and Skochivir but were again counter-attacked and pushed back. The Bulgarians took the village of Brod. The Serbs who had great superiority in artillery attacked constantly. 

On 14 and 15 October 1916, fighting continued without interruption. The Serbian pressure was immense and the Bulgarians continued to hold their positions. During the night of 15 October was one of the culmination moments of the battle when the Serbs made 8 successive attacks which were all repulsed. The Serbs then recovered for three days and on 18 October they crossed the left bank of the River Crna at Brod and fortified it. The Bulgarian army counter-attacked but was repulsed. 

On 23 October the artillery fire of the Entente grew even more. The French were fighting near Kremenica. In the course of a week the Bulgarians tried to push them back without success but all Serbian attacks were also unsuccessful which led to massive casualties for both sides. Due to lack of munitions the Bulgarian artillery had to save shells which had a negative effect on the moral of the soldiers. On 7 November, the enemy artillery started intense fire at 3/8 Brigade, which occupied positions between Krape and Polog. After three days, the losses of the brigade became so immense that on 10 November it abandoned its positions, which were taken by the Serbs. On 19 November the Bulgarians also had to retreat from Bitola and took positions at 5 km to the north of the town. The front stabilized on the line Pelister - Hill 1248 - Hill 1050 - Dabica - Gradešnica.

Aftermath
The Entente continued with its attempts for a breakthrough against the Bulgarians in the area of the River Crna the next year, again without any success. The allied offensive in spring 1917 was a failure. The Bulgarian-German army continued to hold the Macedonian Front against French, British, Serbian and Greek troops until the Franco-Serbian breakthrough at Dobro Pole on 15 September 1918.

Annotations

References

Sources
 Недев, Н., България в световната война (1915-1918), София, 2001, Издателство „Анико“, 
 Атанасов, Щ. и др. Българското военно изкуство през капитализма, София, 1959, Държавно военно издателство при МНО

Cerna Bend
Cerna Bend
Cerna Bend
Cerna Bend
Military history of North Macedonia
Vardar Macedonia (1912–1918)
Macedonian front
October 1916 events
November 1916 events
Battles of World War I involving Russia